Colin Woodard (born December 3, 1968) is an American journalist, writer and historian known for his books American Nations: A History of the Eleven Rival Regional Cultures of North America (2011), The Republic of Pirates (2007), and The Lobster Coast (2004), a cultural and environmental history of coastal Maine.

Education
Woodard graduated from Tufts University with a B.A. and completed his M.A. in international relations at the University of Chicago. In 1999 he was a Pew Fellow in International Journalism at the Johns Hopkins University School for Advanced International Studies. In 2021 he was named a Visiting Senior Fellow at the Pell Center for International Relations and Public Policy at Salve Regina University, where he is now founder and director of Nationhood Lab. He lives outside Portland, Maine.

Career 
Woodard is the author of six works of non-fiction. His first book, Ocean's End: Travels Through Endangered Seas, appeared in 2000. His most recent, Union: The Struggle to Forge the Story of United States Nationhood was published in the spring of 2020 and named a Christian Science Monitor Book of the Year.

He is Director of Nationhood Lab at the Pell Center for International Relations and Public Policy at Salve Regina University, a project focused on counteracting the authoritarian threat to American democracy and the centrifugal forces threatening the U.S. federation’s stability. Prior to that he was State & National Affairs Writer at the Portland Press Herald and Maine Sunday Telegram where he received a 2012 George Polk Award and was a finalist for the 2016 Pulitzer Prize for Explanatory Reporting for a series on climate change and the Gulf of Maine. He received a 2004 Jane Bagley Lehman Award for Public Advocacy (for his global environmental reporting), the 2012 Maine Literary Award for Non-Fiction (for American Nations), the 2016 Maine Literary Award for Non-Fiction (for American Character) and a Pew Fellowship in International Journalism at the Johns Hopkins University School of Advanced International Studies. Woodard was also a finalist for the 2016 Chautauqua Prize (for American Character) and for a Gerald Loeb Award for Distinguished Business and Financial Journalism in both 2013 and 2014. In 2014, The Washington Post named him one of the "Best State Capitol Reporters in America" and the Maine Press Association chose him as Journalist of the Year.

His third book, The New York Times bestseller The Republic of Pirates, was the basis of the 2014 NBC drama Crossbones, written by Neil Cross and starring John Malkovich. Woodard was also a historical consultant for Assassin's Creed IV: Black Flag, which was also set in the time period covered in Republic of Pirates.

He was a long-time foreign correspondent of The Christian Science Monitor, San Francisco Chronicle, and The Chronicle of Higher Education, and has reported from more than fifty foreign countries and seven continents, from postings in Budapest, Hungary; Zagreb, Croatia; Washington, D.C.; and the US–Mexico border. His work has appeared in dozens of publications including The Economist, The New York Times, Smithsonian, The Washington Post, Newsweek/The Daily Beast, Bloomberg View, The Guardian, Washington Monthly, and Down East, where he was a contributing editor. He is currently a contributing editor at Politico.

His sixth book, Union, was released in 2020. The American Scholar said the book "shows just how powerful a form popular nonfiction can be in the hands of a disciplined writer who won’t tolerate generality or abstraction." Iowa Public Radio said "At a time of extreme political polarization, Colin Woodard's latest book seems more pertinent than ever." Loyola's Commonweal Magazine reviewed the book and called it "a fast-paced, character-centered narrative" but questioned its lack of women's voices. Writing in The Washington Post, David W. Blight said "Woodard succeeds in demonstrating the high stakes of master narratives, versions of the past that people choose as identities and stories in which they wish to live."

Selected works 

 Ocean's End: Travel through Endangered Seas, Basic Books, 2000,  ; Chinese edition: Yiwen, 2002, 
 The Lobster Coast: Rebels, Rusticators, and the Struggle for a Forgotten Frontier, Viking, 2004, 
 The Republic of Pirates: Being The True and Surprising Story of the Caribbean Pirates and the Man Who Brought Them Down, Harcourt, 2007, ; UK edition: Pan MacMillan, 2014,  ; Spanish edition: Critica, 2008,  ; Danish edition: Borgens Forlag, 2008, ; Polish edition: SQN, 2014, ; Portuguese edition: Novo Seculo, 2014, ; Hungarian edition: Könyvmolyképző Kiadó, 2014, ; Simplified Chinese edition: Social Sciences Academic Press, 2016, ; Complex Chinese edition: Cite/Business Weekly, 2015, ; Lithuanian edition: Leidykla Briedis, 2021, ; Japanese edition: Panorolling, 2021, 
 American Nations: A History of the Eleven Rival Regional Cultures of North America, Viking, 2011,  ; Korean edition, Geulhangari Publishers, 2017, ; Japanese edition, Iwanami Shoten, 2017, 
 American Character: A History of the Epic Struggle Between Individual Liberty and the Common Good, Viking, 2016, 
 Union: The Struggle to Forge the Story of United States Nationhood, Viking, 2020,

See also
 Bible Belt
 Bioregionalism
 Cascadia (independence movement)
 Ecotopia
 Jesusland map
 Political culture of the United States

References

External links
Official Website

 The Eleven Nations of the United States (July 30, 2018; The New York Times)

American male journalists
Living people
1968 births
Writers from Portland, Maine
Tufts University alumni
University of Chicago alumni
20th-century American journalists
20th-century American non-fiction writers
20th-century American male writers
21st-century American journalists
21st-century American non-fiction writers
21st-century American male writers
American male non-fiction writers
Journalists from Maine
George Polk Award recipients
Piracy